Hildegard is a female name derived from the Old High German hild ('war' or 'battle') and gard ('enclosure' or 'yard'), and means 'battle enclosure'. Variant spellings include: Hildegarde; the Polish, Portuguese, Slovene and Spanish Hildegarda; the Italian Ildegarda; the Hungarian Hildegárd; and the ancient German Hildegardis.

Notable people with the name
 Hilda (Hildegarde) Vīka (1897–1963), Latvian artist and writer
 Hildegard (music duo), 2021 electronic music project by Canadian musicians Helena Deland and Ouri
 Hildegard of Bingen (1098–1179), Christian saint
 Hildegard of Fraumünster (828–856 or 859), daughter of Louis the German and first abbess of Fraumünster
 Hildegard of the Vinzgau, second wife of Charlemagne
 Hildegard, Countess of Auvergne or Matilda (c. 802–841), daughter of Emperor Louis the Pious and Ermengarde of Hesbaye
 Hildegard Behrens (1937–2009), German opera singer
Hildegard Falck (born 1949), German middle distance runner and Olympic medalist
 Hildegard Goebbels (1934–1945), daughter of Nazi Propaganda Minister, Joseph Goebbels and Magda Goebbels.
 Hildegard Hamm-Brücher (1921–2016), German politician
 Hildegarde Howard (1901–1998), American paleornithologist
 Hildegarde Kneeland (1889–1994), American economist and statistician
 Hildegard Knef (1925–2002), German actress, singer and writer
 Hildegard Körner (born 1959), East German middle distance runner and Olympian
 Hildegard Puwak (1949–2018), Romanian politician
 Hildegard Werner, Swedish musician
 Hildegarde (1906–2005), American cabaret singer
 Hildegarde Flanner (1899–1987), American poet and activist
 Hildegarde Dolson Lockridge (1908–1981), poet, playwright and novelist
 Hildegarde Naughton, Irish politician and mayor of Galway
 Hildegart Rodríguez Carballeira, activist for socialism and sexual revolution

Notable fictional characters
Hildegarde Antoinette "Hilda" Spellman, a character in the comic book Sabrina the Teenage Witch and subsequent television series.
Hildegarde (Marvel Comics), a Valkyrie
Hildegarde Withers, in novels and films
Hildegard von Krone, from the Soul series of fighting games
Hildegard von Mariendorf, from Legend of the Galactic Heroes
Hildegarde T., from the anime and manga series Beelzebub by Ryūhei Tamura
Hildegarde, in the Johann Strauss operetta Simplicius
Hildegard 'Hildy' Johnson, from 1940 American comedy film His Girl Friday
Princess Hildegard, from the Disney animated series Sofia the First
Hildegarde, from the game Catan (web/app version)
Hildegard; 'Devout Oracle' from the mobile game Dragalia Lost
Hildegarde (Hilda) from the manga and anime series Beelzebub Beelzebub (manga)
Hildegard Hamhocker, a character in Tumbleweeds (comic strip)
Hildegard "Hildy" Gloom, witch and main antagonist of The 7D

References

Feminine given names
German feminine given names

pl:Hildegarda